The Global Mobile Internet Conference is hosted annually in Beijing and Silicon Valley. Mobile executives, entrepreneurs, developers, and investors from around the globe and across platforms attend GMIC each year.

History

The first annual Global Mobile Internet Conference (GMIC) was hosted in Beijing, China, April 23–25, 2009. The conference, organized by GWC, first aimed to increase the dialogue between mobile internet companies in China and Japan. As the conference became more attended by international attendees, and the attendee base grew from 300 in 2009 to more than 5,000 in 2012, the conference's agenda in 2013 expanded to focus not only on China, but on Asia as a whole, and the opportunity for Western and Asian mobile internet startups and companies to cooperate cross-border.

As of GMIC 2013, GMIC hosts tens of thousands of attendees from more than 60 countries.

GMIC Iterations

 May 26–28, 2010. Beijing, China 
 April 26–28, 2011. Beijing, China 
 May 9–11, 2012. Beijing, China 
 October 19–20, 2012. San Jose, California
 May 7–8, 2013. Beijing, China
 October 21–23, 2013. San Francisco, California
 May 5–6, 2014. Beijing, China
 April 28-May 2, 2016, Beijing, China
 April 28, 2016, Global Virtual Reality Summit, co-organized by DayDayUp in partnership with GMIC, Beijing, China.

Speakers 

Previous GMIC Silicon Valley speakers

 Akira Morikawa, CEO, Line
 Andrew Ng, Co-CEO & Co-Founder, Coursera
 Dave McClure, Managing Partner, 500 Startups
 Dave Roberts, CEO, PopCap Games
 Robert Xiao, CEO, Perfect World
 Ed Fries, Co-Creator, Xbox
 Hugo Barra, VP, Xiaomi Global
 Lei Jun, CEO, Xiaomi
 Mark Shuttleworth, Founder, Ubuntu & Canonical
 Martin Lau, President, Tencent
 Paul Graham, Partner, Y-Combinator
 Pavel Durov, Founder, VK & Telegram
 Phil Libin, CEO, Evernote
 Vaughan Smith, VP, Facebook
 Yu Yongfu, CEO, UCWeb
 Yuri Milner, Founder, DST Global

Previous GMIC Beijing Speakers

China
 Pony Ma, CEO, Tencent
 Robin Li, CEO, Baidu 
 Charles Chao, CEO, Sina
 Joe Wu, CEO, 91 Mobile
 Lei Jun, CEO, Xiaomi
 Yu Yongfu, CEO, UCWeb
 Xu Xiaoping, Founder, Zhenfund Ventures
 Yang Yuanqing, CEO, Lenovo

India
 Abhinav Mathur, CTO, Spice Mobility
 Naveen Tewari, CEO, InMobi
 
Indonesia
 Danny Wirianto, CEO, Mindtalk
 Martin Hartano, CEO, GDP Ventures

Japan
 Isao Moriyasu, CEO, DeNA
 Yoshikazu Tanaka, CEO, GREE
 Takeshi Natsuno, Creator, i-mode

Korea
 Min Seo, CEO, Nexon
 James Song, CEO, Gamevil

USA
 David Roberts, CEO, Popcap Games
 Joff Redfern, VP, LinkedIn
 Phil Libin, CEO, Evernote
 Sanjay Poonen, President, SAP
 Connie Chan, Partner, Andreessen Horowitz

Finland
 Marc Dillon, CEO, Jolla
 Peter Vesterbacka, Mighty Eagle, Rovio

Sweden
 Niklas Zennstrom, Founder, Skype

Australia
 Phil Larsen, CMO, Halfbrick (Fruit Ninja)

Show Highlights

According to its website, GMIC highlights how mobile technology is changing every industry including advertising, education, finance, health, gaming, and marketing. As such it has organized tracks including: m-health, m-marketing, m-education, m-next, MoBiz.

GMIC highlights mobile app developers and startups through its competitions: G-Startup, appAttack, and Global Game Stars.

Headlines from GMIC 

GMIC Silicon Valley 2013
 CIO Ex-Googler Hugo Barra gushes over Chinese Xiaomi's fanboys 
 CIO 'Russian Facebook' CEO Durov disses Zuckerberg, but loves Edward Snowden 
 Forbes Here's Where Teens Are Going Instead Of Facebook
 TechCrunch Y Combinator Startups Now Have A Combined Valuation Of $13.7 Billion, Up $2 Billion Since June

GMIC Beijing 2013

 TechCrunch: Evernote, Now With 4M Users In China, Aims For Enterprises With Yinxiang Biji Business
 TechCrunch: Eyeing $4.5B In Sales This Year, Phone Maker Xiaomi Looks To Emulate A 340-Year-Old Chinese Medicine Company
 BusinessWeek: Angry Birds TV Streaming to an IPad Near You
 Engadget: Jolla's Marc Dillon teases world's first Sailfish device, confirms launch in a couple of weeks
 WSJ: Foreign Tech Companies Changing Tune on China
 Financial Times: Chinese mobile browser eyes global markets

References 

Technology conferences
Annual events in Silicon Valley
Annual events in Beijing